Huehuetla is one of the 84 municipalities of Hidalgo, in central-eastern Mexico. The municipality covers an area of 262.1 km².

In 2005, the municipality had a total population of 22,927. In 2017 there were 13,012 inhabitants who spoke an indigenous language, primarily Sierra Otomi and Tepehua.

References

Municipalities of Hidalgo (state)